Janet Adam (14 January 1940 – 1 September 2021) was a Scottish potter and sculptor. She was a founding member of the Scottish Potters Association and active in it for 47 years.

Biography 
Adam was born in Edinburgh on 14th January 1940, to Barbara Eunice Marindin and Captain Charles Adam, as one of four siblings. Adam attended West Heath Girls' School. After working as a secretary, she learned pottery on the Isle of Mull in the late 1960s. She moved to Edinburgh in the 1970s and was instructed in pottery through independent learning and a part-time course at Edinburgh College of Art.

Adam first founded the Cannonmills Pottery in the 1970s on Warriston Road in Edinburgh. In 1983 the workshop moved to Henderson Row where it was named Adams Pottery. It served her and five other potters as a studio and workshop space.

Adam's work was primarily based around making functional individual pieces of pottery. She was a founding member of the Scottish Potters Association and contributed to it for 47 years.

References 

1940 births
2021 deaths
20th-century Scottish women artists
21st-century Scottish women artists
Artists from Edinburgh
Scottish pottery
Scottish women sculptors
Women potters